Alan Derek Kershaw (born 23 April 1954) is an English former footballer who played for Southport in The Football League.

Playing career
After serving as an apprentice with Preston North End, Kershaw moved to Southport. At Southport, he played 24 times.

References

1954 births
Living people
English footballers
Preston North End F.C. players
Southport F.C. players
Dundee United F.C. players
Hakoah Sydney City East FC players
IFK Malmö Fotboll players
Formby F.C. players
Leyland Motors F.C. players
English Football League players
Association football fullbacks
English expatriate footballers
Expatriate soccer players in Australia
English expatriate sportspeople in Australia
Expatriate footballers in Sweden
English expatriate sportspeople in Sweden